Emily Baadsvik (born April 12, 1983) is a Canadian bobsledder.

Career highlights

Olympic Winter Games
2014 – Sochi, Alternate – Push Athlete, Did Not Compete

World Championships
2013 – St. Moritz,  3rd with Kaillie Humphries
2012 – Lake Placid, 6th with Jennifer Ciochetti

World Cup Single Events
2013/2014 – Park City, 13th with Jennifer Ciochetti
2012/2013 – La Plagne, 13th with Jennifer Ciochetti
2012/2013 – Park City, 14th with Jennifer Ciochetti
2011/2012 – La Plagne,  1st with Kaillie Humphries
2011/2012 – Whistler,  1st with Kaillie Humphries
2011/2012 – St. Moritz, 4th with Kaillie Humphries
2011/2012 – Königsee,  2nd with Kaillie Humphries

References

1983 births
Living people
Canadian female bobsledders
People from Smithers, British Columbia
Sportspeople from British Columbia
21st-century Canadian women